Sarapuí is a municipality in the state of São Paulo in Brazil. It is part of the Metropolitan Region of Sorocaba. The population is 10,390 (2020 est.) in an area of 352.53 km². The elevation is 590 m.

References

Municipalities in São Paulo (state)